Odontites litoralis is a species of flowering plant belonging to the family Orobanchaceae.

Its native range is Northern and Northwestern Europe.

References

litoralis